Christakis is a name of Greek origin and may refer to:

Surname
Alexander Christakis (born 1937), Greek-American social scientist, systems scientist and cyberneticist
Erika Christakis, American expert in early childhood education
Georgios Christakis-Zografos (1863–1920), Greek politician
Nicholas A. Christakis (born 1962), American physician and social scientist

Given name
Christakis Charalambides (Stephanos of Tallinn, born 1940), primate of the Estonian Apostolic Orthodox Church
Christakis Zografos (1820–1898), Greek banker

Greek-language surnames
Surnames